Netherlands Aircraft Company (formerly Rekkof Aircraft - from Fokker spelled backwards) is a Dutch company dedicated to restarting the production of upgraded versions of the Fokker 70 and Fokker 100 regional jets as production of those stopped when Fokker was declared bankrupt in 1996.  The initial plan was to start building unmodified versions of both the Fokker 70 and the Fokker 100. For this all tooling for these airplanes was bought from Fokker during the bankruptcy period. Later on the decision was made to make several improvements to the airframe. This resulted in the Fokker 120NG which was further stretched to the Fokker 130NG due to altered market demands. The Fokker 130NG would be able to carry 130 to 138 passengers. It would get a new interior, improved avionics, a fly-by-wire system, sharklets and two Pratt & Whitney PurePower PW1217G-engines.

Rekkof believes there is a sufficient market for the aircraft and that the design can still compete with similar modern regional airliners from manufacturers as Embraer and Bombardier Aerospace. The future of the project started to look bright when in 2007 both Premion and VLM airlines placed an order for 25 Fokker 100NG and investor Mubadala was in negotiations for an investment of about one billion US dollars. But the deal with Mubadala never materialized. In the end of 2014 another unnamed investor showed interest to invest one billion US dollars in the project but this never finalized as the investor was never heard of again.

In March 2010 it was announced that the Dutch government granted the company a 20 million euro loan to help develop the aircraft by acquiring the Fokker 100 testbed aircraft PH-MKH from Fokker Technologies. Though Rekkof has stated that it prefers to assemble the aircraft in the Netherlands, with Lelystad Airport and Enschede Airport Twente mentioned as possible assembly locations, Bangalore in India had also been mentioned as a possible location with Indian engineering firm Cades Digitech having stated it was planning to invest 300 million US dollars in an assembly plant. Construction on an aircraft parts plant started in November 2011 in the Brazilian state of Goiás in the city of Anápolis (some 35 mi/55 km from state capital Goiânia). The works were however suspended due to the crisis in Europe  Later on, Rekkof mentioned that assembly of the airplane would have to stay in the Netherlands due to certification procedures.

Netherlands Aircraft Company is a part of Panta Holdings BV, which also at one point owned Denim Air and VLM Airlines, both operating Fokker F50 aircraft. Denim Air had stopped flying in 2010 and resumed operations after successful restructuring, while VLM Airlines has been sold to Air France-KLM and has become a part of its subsidiary Cityjet after which it went bankrupt.

Proposed Products
 NAC Fokker 90NG - 100 passenger regional jet based on Fokker 70
 NAC Fokker  - 138 passenger regional jet based on Fokker 100

Standard seating for both aircraft is based on 30 inch seat pitch, which many airlines are now standardising on using so called "slim seats"

Standstill

The project does not seem to have progressed. Since the Dutch government was allowed to supply Rekkof funds to develop the new aircraft, not a lot has happened. Rekkof visualised its plane on its website. No public report has been produced detailing spending of government-supplied funds. Parliamentary documents show that Rekkof has, thus far, not been able to co-finance the development. This information is only in Dutch and can be found at the tweedekamer.nl website.

References

External links
Netherlands Aircraft Company (official website)

Fokker